The Joint Navigation Warfare Center (JNWC) is a subordinate center of United States Space Command's Combined Force Space Component Command. It is responsible for planning and coordinating navigation warfare operations. The JNWC is located at Kirtland Air Force Base.

Mission
The Joint Navigation Warfare Center plans, tasks, integrates, provides C2, and supports integrated Navigation Warfare (NAVWAR) worldwide. 

Navigation warfare means the use of the "Air Force Global Positioning System satellite navigation system by the Department of Defense and its allies, and attempts to disrupt the system by adversaries." 

Command and control is conducted day-to-day, through reachback capabilities and deployable subject matter experts, in support of combatant commanders (CCDRs). Assistance is provided via the JNWC NAVWAR support cell, coordination cells, and deployable theater coordination cells. CCDR requests for NAVWAR capabilities are supported by United States Space Command components after deconfliction and prioritization of ongoing missions.

History
Established on 1 October 2004, the Joint Navigation Warfare Center was initially under the office of the Assistant Secretary of Defense for Networks and Information Integration, but in October 2007 was moved under the Joint Functional Component Command for Space, which evolved into United States Space Command.

References

Joint military units and formations of the United States
Space units and formations of the United States
Centers of the U.S. Department of Defense
Military units and formations established in 2004